The National Medal is an Australian award given for long service by operational members of specified eligible organisations.  It was introduced in 1975, as an original component of the new Australian honours system, and replaced a range of medals available to military and civilian uniformed services for long service and good conduct. The eligible groups have in common that their members serve or protect the community at the risk of death, injury or trauma, hence it is only available to members of the eligible organisations who are operationally deployed.  In the case of corrective services, eligibility is restricted to officers with custodial duties.

Description
 The National Medal is a circular bronze medal, ensigned with the Crown of St Edward. The obverse shows the Arms of the Commonwealth of Australia within a rim carrying the inscription "The National Medal for Service" in capital letters.
 The reverse is plain.
 The 32mm-wide ribbon has 15 alternating gold and blue stripes. These colours are the livery colours of Australia, derived from the torse of the Coat of Arms of Australia.  
 The clasp is a bronze bar having 10 raised hemispheres. When the ribbon is worn alone, the award of a clasp is indicated by a ribbon emblem in the form of a representation of the medal.

History
The award was originally available to members of the Australian Defence Force (ADF), Australian police services, fire services and ambulance services.  Eligible service was only counted after a person turned 18, and service had to be continuous.

In 1982, the ADF withdrew from the National Medal, with the introduction of the Defence Force Service Awards (comprising the Defence Force Service Medal, the Reserve Force Decoration and the Reserve Force Medal).  Even now, however, ADF service can be counted towards the National Medal under certain circumstances.  At the same time, it was made explicit that service would be taken into account for the award regardless of whether it was full-time or part-time, paid or unpaid.  This allowed volunteer fire fighters to qualify for the medal.

In 1986, the Australian Protective Service was admitted to eligibility, followed in 1987 by the Australian correctional services and Australian emergency services (i.e. the state-based and constituted civil emergency response services).

In 1999, the regulations governing the National Medal were completely revised and re-issued by Letters Patent to modify many points of eligibility, and to allow the addition of government and voluntary search and rescue organisations without the need to seek amendments to the Letters Patent by the monarch.  The Governor-General of the Commonwealth of Australia can now determine, by written instrument, that additional organisations are eligible.

National Police Service Medal
On 2 March 2011, the Australian Government announced that Queen Elizabeth II had signed Letters Patent on Tuesday 9 November 2010 instituting a new award within the Australian honours and awards system to accord "recognition for the unique contribution and significant commitment of those persons who have given ethical and diligent service as a sworn member of an Australian police service."  This new award is to be known as the National Police Service Medal.  All Australian police will now receive the National Police Service Medal to recognise their contribution to policing as well as the National Medal to recognise their long service upon completion of 15 years ethical and diligent service.

Eligibility
The National Medal recognises those who put themselves at risk in the service of the community, or in the course of enforcing the law to protect persons and property.  The regulations governing the award use the term "primary function" to describe this concept.  Members of eligible organisations who do not perform the "primary function" are therefore not eligible, for example, administrative staff of fire services, or non-custodial staff of correctional services, however emergency service dispatchers and communications officers who take 000 calls and co-ordinate the movement of fire and ambulance appliances are eligible to receive the award, after amendment to regulations.

To qualify a person must have served an eligible organisation for at least 15 years in the primary function, and the chief officer of the organisation must assess their service as "diligent".  From 1999 service did not have to be continuous, and the only restriction on counting service with several eligible organisations is that simultaneous service with more than one organisation is only counted once (i.e. no double-counting).  Service must include at least one day on or after 14 February 1975 (the day the award was established) and at least one day on or after the "approval date" for at least one organisation served.  For the original organisations (police, fire, ambulance, defence) the "approval date" is 14 February 1975.  Other organisations have approval dates as determined by the Governor-General, which ensures that a person whose service entirely pre-dates approval as an eligible organisation can't claim the award.

Nominations
The Chief Officer of each eligible organisation is authorised to recommend to the Governor-General that an award be made to a member of his or her organisation.  Where a person's eligible service spans several organisations, it is the current, or most recent Chief Officer who makes the recommendation.  Organisations periodically submit schedules of multiple awards to Government House rather than sending them one at a time.  The process is the same for awards of clasps indicating a further 10 years of service.

Documentation
The regulations governing the award, a list of eligible organisations, and the Chief Officers Manual for the National Medal are available from the National Medal page of the Australian honours website.

See also
 Australian honours system
 Australian Honours Order of Wearing

References

External links
 National Medal, It's an Honour – Australian Government site.
 National Medal fact sheet, It's an Honour – Australian Government site.
 The National Medal, ADF Honours and Awards, www.defence.gov.au

Civil awards and decorations of Australia
Military awards and decorations of Australia
1975 establishments in Australia
Awards established in 1975
Long service medals
Long and Meritorious Service Medals of Britain and the Commonwealth